The Battle of Tachiao (March 18–19, 1942), was the first clash in the Battle of Yunnan-Burma Road in the Burma Campaign of World War II and Second Sino-Japanese War.

Advanced elements of the 200th Division arrived at Toungoo on March 8, 1942 and took over defensive positions from the British forces.  The city of Toungoo itself would be the main defensive position of the Chinese forces, with an outpost a few kilometers to the south at Oktwin.  Major-General Dai Anlan the divisional commander,  sent the Motorized Cavalry Regiment and 1st Company, 598th Infantry Regiment to the banks of the Kan River 35 miles south of Toungoo and 12 miles south of the town of Pyu.  The cavalry regiment plus a company of infantry pushed up to Kan River, with a platoon of cyclists taking up positions at the bridge over the river.

At first light on March 18, about 200 Japanese reconnaissance troops from the 143rd Regiment of the 55th Division advanced right up to the bridge on motorbikes. Reaching the outposts they were ambushed by the Chinese troops hiding along the sides of the road. Chinese armoured cars joined the attack and after three hours of fighting the Japanese fell back, leaving some 30 dead behind together with some twenty rifles, two light machine guns and some 19 motorbikes. After night fell, the Japanese continued their attacks with small units, and the Chinese covering force fell back toward their line at Oktwin. Following up the next day, Pyu fell to the Japanese on the 19th.

See also 
Battle of Oktwin

References

External links
China's Anti-Japanese War Combat Operations 
 U.S. Army Map Service, Topographic Map NE 47-5 Toungoo
 Axis History Forum: Chinese 200th Division: descriptions of actions needed! Discussion and map of the battle of Toungoo and the actions leading up to it.

Tachiao
Tachiao
Tachiao
1942 in Japan
1942 in Burma
Tachiao
March 1942 events